Hans Aderhold (13 May 1919 – 4 August 1987) was a German diver. He competed in the 1952 Summer Olympics.

References

1919 births
1987 deaths
Divers at the 1952 Summer Olympics
German male divers
Olympic divers of Germany
Sportspeople from Osnabrück
20th-century German people